The Lava Lakes are a group of small lakes at the head of Lava Fork in the Boundary Ranges of northwestern British Columbia, Canada.

These lava flows dam and form the lakes, hence giving their name.

See also
 Lava Lake (British Columbia)

References

Lakes of British Columbia
Boundary Ranges
Lava dammed lakes